Kiislova (also Kislova, Väike-Kiislova, Väike-Kislova, Urpuse, Ruusma, Kruusmäe) is a village in Setomaa Parish, Võru County in southeastern Estonia. It is located beside the Russian border, but there is not a border crossing. As of 2011 Census, the village's population was 6.

References

Villages in Võru County